AudioCulture is a New Zealand On Air funded online project billed as the "Noisy Library of New Zealand Music". Working with artists, historians and music industry people, the website tells the story of nearly 100 years of New Zealand popular music culture, from the first local recordings in the 1920s to digital streaming.

The website launched on 31 May 2013, with 250 published pages and since then has been growing steadily with new pages and stories added regularly.

Organisation
The site was conceived and founded by New Zealand music industry historian and pioneer Simon Grigg. Grigg first conceived an online database of New Zealand music in the late 2000s and spent much of the next few years seeking funding and gathering support from the music industry in New Zealand. Backed by Recorded Music New Zealand he approached various funding bodies but was repeatedly turned down. Finally, in 2012 NZ On Air agreed to fund the site. AudioCulture was placed under the wing of the same trust that's in charge of the sibling project NZ On Screen but the content was curated and directed by Grigg, now named as Creative Director. Under Grigg, content was created by some 35 writers and contributed to by a large number of photographers.

AudioCulture has partnerships with The National Library of New Zealand and Radio New Zealand.

In September 2016, Grigg resigned as Creative Director, handing the role to New Zealand writer and historian Chris Bourke. Grigg retains a position as founding editor.

References

External links
 AudioCulture Website

Music organisations based in New Zealand
New Zealand digital libraries
2013 establishments in New Zealand
Internet properties established in 2013